Dargah Sharif Pir Jhando is a village of Saeedabad Taluka in Sindh Province of Pakistan. The village is historically known for its madrasa Darul Irshad, and its Islamic Library(المکتبۃ العالیۃ العلمیہ) which used to be a well-established Islamic institute in the region for Islamic religious and educational services
Rashdi family of Pir Jhando is descendant of Pirsain Sayyid Muhammad Rashid (known as Pirsain Rozeh dhani  

(Pir of Pir JhandoVII)

Pir Sayyid Muhammad Yaseen Shah RashdiAl-Husayni(Pir Sain Jhandewaro VII) along with his younger brother Pir Sayyid Qasim Shah Rashidi (Al-Husayni) has contributed a lot to keep moving to its islamic history and its forefathers roots on the right path with strong infleunce over their followers or murids,

Refutation of Shirk and Bid'dah Jahalat is their Aim, they're mainly Ahly Ahadith| The Dargah Sharif Pir Jhando The Rashidi family is widely known in the subcontinent asPirs of Sind

This village is located at a distance of five kilometers.

[درگاه شريف پير جھنڊو] is not a city of millions of people but a very small village with barely thirty houses and three hundred people.  Such a small village and such a great history and birthplace of Muhadditheen.  Subhan Allah.  Perhaps no such example can be found in the sub continent or almost whole world. 

The family has contributed in upbringing Islamic learning and spirituality with the support of various Islamic scholars including Pir Sayyid Ihsanullah Shah Rashdi known as Pirsain Jhandewaro (Sunnat Dhani) and his son(Sucessor)
Pir Alamah Sayyid Muhaibullah Shah Rashdi (Pir Sain Jhandewaro) and Alamah Badi'ud din Shah Al-Rashdi, notably, Maulana Ubaidullah Sindhi, Molana Najam-ud-Din, Molana Muhammad Ahmadani Laghari, Molana Abdullah Laghari and many others are also worth mentioning.  Some things are important to note that In the libraries of East and West, Egypt and Syria, Arabia and Constantinople their scribes and transcribers used to copy new books from (المکتبۃ العالیۃ العلمیہ) which was on its highest in the era of Pir Sayyid Ihsanullah Shah Rashdi, he was a Aalim a great scholar of Hadith and Rijal, Dargah Sharif Pir Jhando library considered to be most highest Islamic Maktabah in the subcontinent. Once the government of Saudi Arabia wrote a letter to them and asked that we know that there are 2 rare books in the whole world and one is in Al-Maktaba Al-Aliyyah Al-Ulamiyyah, we want to know how they are preserved there.  A similar incident happened at Al-Azhar University in Egypt, when a part of a rare book they were looking for was found in the library. They were very impressed and equally surprised. and wanted to know more about المکتبۃ العالیۃ العلمیہ  rare books and knowledge.  This shows the love of the books of these scholars and their contribution, may Allah have mercy on Muhammad S.A.W and his descendants.

References

 2.^ https://aalequtub.com/2021/08/21/dargah-sharif-pir-jhando/

 3.^
 Cambridge South Asian StudiesSufi 
 Saints and State Power: The Pirs of 
 Sind, 1843 1947

 Sarah F.D. Ansari   https://www.goodreads.com/en/book/show/2825131

Matiari District
Populated places in Matiari District